Barton–Lexa School District is a public school district based in Phillips County, Arkansas. The school district supports early childhood, elementary and secondary education in prekindergarten through grade 12 for more than 800 students and employs more than 100 faculty and staff for its two schools.
The school district encompasses  of land and serves the all or portions of the communities of Barton, Lexa, Helena-West Helena, Lake View, and Poplar Grove.

On July 1, 2004, the Lake View School District was consolidated into the Barton–Lexa School District.

Schools 
 Barton High School, serving grades 7 through 12.
 Barton Elementary School, serving prekindergarten through grade 6.

References

Further reading
 Maps of the district and predecessors
 2004-2005 School District Map
 Map of Arkansas School Districts pre-July 1, 2004
  (Download)

External links
 

Education in Phillips County, Arkansas
School districts in Arkansas